Sharpie, Sharpy or Sharpey may refer to:

Boats
 Sharpie (boat), a type of long, narrow sailboat
 12m² Sharpie, a small, vintage, former Olympic sailboat

People
 Sharpie, a member of Skinheads Against Racial Prejudice
 Sharpies (Australian subculture), members of certain Australian youth gangs in the 1960s and 1970s
 William Sharpey (1802–1880), Scottish anatomist and physiologist called the "father of British physiology"
 Thomas J. Sharpy, United States Air Force lieutenant general, commander of the Eighteenth Air Force in 2015
 Sharpy or Sharpie, nickname of Patrick Sharp (born 1981), Canadian retired ice hockey player 
 Sharpy, nickname of Will Sharp (born 1986), Nigerian rugby league footballer

Other uses
 Sharpie (marker), a brand of markers, particularly permanent markers
 Sharp-shinned hawk, a bird sometimes referred to as a "sharpie"
 Sharpy, a character in The Bluffers, a Dutch children's cartoon series
 Sharpie, a nickname for steam locomotives manufactured by Sharp Brothers - see History of rail transport#Further developments

See also

 The Sharpees, an American R&B group
 Shar Pei, a breed of dog
 Sharp (disambiguation)
 Sharpe (disambiguation)
 Sharps (disambiguation)